Cwm Taf Morgannwg University Health Board (CTMUHB) is the local health board of NHS Wales for Merthyr Tydfil, Rhondda Cynon Taf, and Bridgend in the south of Wales. It was renamed from Cwm Taf University Health Board on 1 April 2019 following the transfer of Bridgend County Borough from the former Abertawe Bro Morgannwg University Health Board (now Swansea Bay University Health Board).

It was established in 2009 as the legal successor organisation to Cwm Taf NHS Trust. The Trust was formed on 1 April 2008, following the merger of the North Glamorgan and Pontypridd & Rhondda NHS Trusts. Cwm Taf Morgannwg University Health Board is the operational name of Cwm Taf Morgannwg Local Health Board.

Cwm Taf Morgannwg University Health Board provides healthcare services mainly for the population of Merthyr Tydfil County Borough, Rhondda Cynon Taf County Borough and (from 1 April 2019) Bridgend County Borough. Cwm Taf Morgannwg NHS Trust's headquarters are in Ynysmeurig House, Navigation Park, Abercynon, Wales.

Performance
Maternity services have been put into special measures in April 2019 after investigations into the standards of maternity care.

Hospitals
Current hospitals

Dewi Sant Hospital, Pontypridd 
Glanrhyd Hospital, Bridgend
Maesteg Community Hospital, Bridgend
Pontypridd Cottage Hospital, Pontypridd
Prince Charles Hospital, Merthyr Tydfil
Princess of Wales Hospital, Bridgend
Royal Glamorgan Hospital, Llantrisant
Ysbyty Cwm Cynon, Cynon Valley
Ysbyty Cwm Rhondda, Rhondda
Ysbyty George Thomas, Treorchy

Former Hospitals

Aberdare General Hospital, Aberdare, Cynon Valley
Mountain Ash General Hospital, Mountain Ash, Cynon Valley
St Tydfil's General Hospital, Merthyr Tydfil

References

External links 
 

 
Merthyr Tydfil
Rhondda Cynon Taf